Singal Junction, also known as the Singal JC, is a junction located in Giheung-gu, Yongin, Gyeonggi, South Korea. Gyeongbu Expressway (No. 1) and Yeongdong Expressway (No. 50) meet here. It is named after the neighbourhood in which it is located, Singal-dong. The type of junction is combination interchange. It is Sin-gal Junction, not Sing-al Junction.

Gyeongbu Expressway
Yeongdong Expressway
Expressway junctions in South Korea
Yongin